Ann Marie Craig (born 4 June 1961 in Ithaca, New York) is a Canadian neurologist researching synaptogenesis and synaptic plasticity. She is a tenured Professor of Psychiatry and holds the Canada Research Chair in Neurobiology at University of British Columbia.

Education 
Marie Craig did her BSc. in biochemistry from Carleton University and received her PhD from University of Western Ontario. She was a postdoctoral fellow at National Institutes of Health, USA and University of Virginia in the field of neuroscience.

Honors 
She was awarded with a Pew Scholarship in 1977. In 2008, she was elected as a fellow of the Royal Society of Canada.

References 

Living people
Fellows of the Royal Society of Canada
Canadian neurologists
University of Western Ontario alumni
Carleton University alumni
Academic staff of the University of British Columbia
1961 births